Yella is a 2007 German drama-thriller film written and directed by Christian Petzold and starring Nina Hoss. The film is an unofficial remake of the 1962 American film Carnival of Souls. Yella premiered at the 57th Berlin International Film Festival where Hoss won the Silver Bear for Best Actress award.

Plot
Following a separation from her husband, Yella Fichte (Nina Hoss) plans to leave Wittenberge for a new accountancy job in Hanover. Her husband, Ben (Hinnerk Schönemann), insists on giving her a ride to the train station. She reluctantly agrees. When she refuses to return to him, he becomes abusive and won't let her out of the car. He drives through a bridge siding into a river. They both escape the crash, but Yella leaves him unconscious on the shoreline and catches her train.

On her arrival, she is approached by Philipp (Devid Striesow), a businessman, about becoming his assistant. She doesn't give him a firm answer. The next day, she discovers that the man who hired her no longer works for the company. The man convinces her to steal a portfolio from the office for him but rewards her by making a crude pass that she rebuffs.

She plans to return to Wittenberge the next day and falls asleep with her door open. Philipp walks in, awakens her and renews his offer. She accepts. He involves her in a series of unethical moneymaking schemes using evidence of malfeasance to scam money out of competitors. Philipp tests her loyalty by asking her to make various deposits totaling €75,000, but actually gives her €100,000. She plans to keep the difference to bribe Ben to stay away, but Philipp catches her. She explains her situation and he forgives her.

On separate occasions, Ben attempts to kidnap her and tries to bargain with her to return to him. Instead, his abusive gestures drive her into Philipp's arms. Philipp loses his job due to his unethical practices. He tells Yella that their scams were intended to raise money to begin a new enterprise, but he's short €200,000. Yella blackmails one of his previous victims for the additional funds. As they wait for the man to deliver the money to them, Yella has a strange vision of him. When he doesn't arrive as expected, she is compelled to look for him.

At the man's home, his wife helps Yella. They find him face down in a backyard pond. Philipp arrives and helps pull the body out of the water while Yella leaves. As she's crying in the back of a taxi, Yella suddenly finds herself back in Ben's car, going off the bridge.

Wittenberge police pull Ben's car from the water and find Yella and Ben's bodies inside.

Cast
 Nina Hoss - Yella Fichte
 Devid Striesow - Philipp
 Hinnerk Schönemann - Ben
 Burghart Klaußner - Dr. Gunthen
 Barbara Auer - Barbara Gunthen
 Christian Redl - Yella's father
 Michael Wittenborn - Dr. Schmidt-Ott
 Wanja Mues - Sprenger
 Martin Brambach - Dr. Fritz
 Joachim Nimtz - Prietzel
 Peter Benedict - Dr. Friedrich's lawyer Oliver
 Peter Knaack - official receiver
 Selin Bademsoy - Dr. Gunthen's daughter

Release

Home media
Yella was released on DVD by Artificial Eye on January 28, 2008. It was later released by Cinema Guild on March 31, 2009.

Reception

On review aggregator Rotten Tomatoes, Yella holds an approval rating of 81%, based on 53 reviews, and an average rating of 6.57/10. Its consensus reads, "Chilly and haunting, Yella'''s atmosphere gets under the skin."

Roger Ebert praised the film awarding it 3.5 out of 4 stars stating, "The writer-director, Christian Petzold, uses a spare, straightforward visual style for the most part, except for those cutaways to trees blowing in the wind whenever we heard the harsh bird cry. He trusts his story and characters. And he trusts us to follow the business deals and become engrossed in the intrigue. I did." Ebert also praised male leads Striesow and Schoenemann calling the similarities of both characters' physical presences as being "unsettling". Stephen Holden from The New York Times gave the film a positive review, praising the film's symbolism, atmosphere, and Hoss' performance; writing,  "Yella is the kind of movie that tantalizes the mind with possibilities without solving the puzzle." Time Out awarded the film four out of five stars, calling it "an expertly crafted thriller which offers a pessimistic, though deeply rewarding, glimpse of a society being haunted by its own past." Walter Addiego of the San Francisco Chronicle praised the film's atmosphere, Petzold's direction, and Hoss' performance. Peter Bradshaw of The Guardian'' rated the film four out of five stars, calling it "exquisitely frigid, menacing, disquieting, with a storyline that keeps you off-balance, marred only by a slightly hackneyed dénouement".

References

External links
 
 
 

2007 films
2007 horror films
2000s thriller films
2000s romantic thriller films
Films directed by Christian Petzold
German horror films
2000s German-language films
German thriller films
Remakes of American films
Horror film remakes
2000s psychological horror films
Films set in Germany
2000s German films